The coat of arms of Saint Lucia was adopted on 8 January 1979, by a royal warrant of Queen Elizabeth II. The national motto (the land, the people, the light) is found at the bottom.

Official description
The government of Saint Lucia describes the arms as follows:

Azure two sticks of cut bamboo in Cross surmounted of an African stool of authority Or between in dexter chief and sinister base a Rose Argent charged with another Gules both barbed and seeded proper an in sinister chief and dexter base a Fleur-de-lis Gold and for the Crest upon a Helm with a Wreath Or and Azure in front of two Fronds of the Fern Polypoduim in Saltire a Cubit Arm proper the hand holding erect a Torch Gold enflamed also proper and for the Supporters on either side a Saint Lucia Parrot commonly called Jacquot (Amazona versicolor) wings elevated and addorsed and in the beak of each a Frond of the Fern Polypoduim all proper and for the Motto: THE LAND-THE PEOPLE-THE LIGHT

Historical versions

References

External links
 Biography available in The Designers (Saint Lucia National Symbols)
  Coat of Arms of Saint Lucia

National symbols of Saint Lucia
Saint Lucia
Saint Lucia
Saint Lucia
Saint Lucia
Saint Lucia
Saint Lucia
Saint Lucia
Saint Lucia
Saint Lucia